Manohar Bhoir is a Shiv Sena politician from Raigad district in the Indian state of Maharashtra. He is a member of the 13th Maharashtra Legislative Assembly. He represents the Uran Assembly Constituency. He supports giving free education to poor people.

Career 
From 2014-2019 he worked as an MLA for Uran. He helped Gharapuri island (Elephanta) get electricity. He helped build a jetty at Karanja for Koli people (fishermen). He is known for Helping Hand for Handicapped. 

During the COVID-19 pandemic he helped needy people by donating food items. He helped create Uran Got Covid-Centre at Bokadvira.

See also
 Maval Lok Sabha constituency

References

External links
 Shiv Sena Official website

Maharashtra MLAs 2014–2019
Living people
Shiv Sena politicians
People from Raigad district
Marathi politicians
Year of birth missing (living people)